Eva Ann-Louise Skoglund (born 28 June 1962) is a retired track and field hurdler from Sweden. She is best known for winning the gold medal in the women's 400m hurdles at the 1982 European Championships, and she set the world best year performance in her event in 1982.

References

 

1962 births
Living people
Swedish female hurdlers
Athletes (track and field) at the 1980 Summer Olympics
Athletes (track and field) at the 1984 Summer Olympics
Olympic athletes of Sweden
Sportspeople from Karlstad
European Athletics Championships medalists
World Athletics Championships athletes for Sweden
20th-century Swedish women